Carl Semb (19 August 1895 – 16 July 1971) was an internationally renowned Norwegian surgeon and professor at the University of Oslo.

Biography
Carl Boye Semb grew up in Oslo, Norway. He was a cand.med. in 1920 and dr.med. in 1929. After eighteen years as a district doctor in Gimsøy and Skjervøy, Semb became chief physician at the surgical ward at Ullevål hospital (1935–65). He was a professor of surgery at the University of Oslo (1951-1965). Semb was chairman of the Norwegian Surgical Society (1940-1947). Semb was President of the Nordic Surgical Society (1955–56).

During World War II, Semb engaged in the resistance movement and joined the Milorg. He was a central Milorg leader, from 1941 to 1943, when he had to flee to Sweden. He is particularly noted for his role in the formation of Norwegian police troops in Sweden during World War II. His pioneering initiative resulted in health camps and a vaccination plan for the refugees. After the war, he was Chief of the Norwegian Army Medical Corps (1945-1947).

Personal life
On February 19, 1926, he married Helga Louise Stenersen, the daughter of Norwegian painter Gudmund Stenersen. They had five children. In 1955, he was appointed Commander of the Order of St. Olav.

Selected works
Toracoplasty with extrafascial apicollysis (1935) 
Sykdommer i mamma (in "Nordisk lærebok i kirurgi") (1941)
Lungenchirurgie (1944) 
Svulster og Halsens sykdommer (in "Nordisk lærebok i kirurgi") (1948)

References

Other sources
Söderman, Harry(1946)  Polititroppene i Sverige. Norska och danska trupper i Sverige (Oslo: Gyldendal)

1895 births
1971 deaths
Norwegian resistance members
Academic staff of the University of Oslo
Oslo University Hospital people